Charlie Reid was an Ireland international footballer. Reid played for several clubs in the League of Ireland and won two FAI Cup winners medals (Shamrock Rovers 1936 and St James's Gate 1938) and another 2 runners-up medals (Brideville 1930 and Dolphin 1933).

International career
In April 1931, Reid made his only appearance for Ireland in a 1–1 draw with Spain in the Estadio de Montjuic, Barcelona.

References

Republic of Ireland association footballers
Republic of Ireland international footballers
St James's Gate F.C. players
Dundalk F.C. players
League of Ireland players
Year of birth missing
Place of birth missing
Year of death missing
Association football forwards
Dolphin F.C. players